Somebody Has to Shoot the Picture is a 1990 American made-for-television prison drama film written by photojournalist Doug Magee, inspired by his interviews with and photos of death row prisoners. The film was directed by Frank Pierson.

Plot

Cast
 Roy Scheider as Paul Marish, Photographer
 Bonnie Bedelia as Hannah McGrath
 Robert Carradine as Police Sgt. Jerry Brown
 Andre Braugher as Dan Weston, Time Magazine Reporter
 Arliss Howard as Raymond Eames
 Jay Glick as Prison chaplain
 John Polce as Executioner

References

External links

1990 television films
1990 films
1990 crime drama films
American prison drama films
American crime drama films
1990s prison films
HBO Films films
Films directed by Frank Pierson
Films scored by James Newton Howard
1990s English-language films
1990s American films